Alfonso (and variants Alphonso, Afonso, Alphons, and Alphonse) is a masculine given name.

It may also refer to:

In arts and entertainment
Alfonso und Estrella, an opera by Franz Schubert
 Éditions Alphonse Leduc, a prominent French music publishing company specializing in classical music

Places

Natural formations
Alphonse Group, a group of atolls in the Outer Islands of the Seychelles named for chevalier Alphonse de Pontevez
Alphonse Atoll, in the Outer Islands of the Seychelles

Inhabited places
Alfonso, Cavite, a municipality in the Philippines
Afonso Cláudio, a municipality in Brazil
Alfonso Castañeda, Nueva Vizcaya, a municipality in the Philippines
Ribeira Afonso, a river and village in São Tomé and Príncipe
Alfonso Lista, Ifugao, a municipality in the Philippines
Paulo Afonso, a city in Brazil

Airports
Alfonso Bonilla Aragón International Airport, also known as Palmaseca International Airport, an airport in Colombia
Afonso Pena International Airport, an airport in Brazil
Saint-Alphonse/Lac Cloutier Water Aerodrome, an airport in Canada

Stadiums
Estadio Alfonso López Pumarejo, a football stadium in Colombia
Coliseum Alfonso Pérez, football stadium in Spain
Estadio Alfonso Chico Carrasquel, a multi-use stadium in Venezuela
Estadio Alfonso Lastras, multi-use unfinished stadium in Mexico
Estadio Alfonso López, multi-use stadium in Colombia
Estádio D. Afonso Henriques, a football stadium in Portugal
Estadio Luis Alfonso Giagni, multi-use stadium in Paraguay
Stade Alphonse Massemba-Débat, a national stadium of the Republic of the Congo
Stade Alphonse Theis, a football stadium in Luxembourg

Other uses
Alphonso (mango), a type of mango found in India
Alphonso, a book by Stéphanie Félicité, comtesse de Genlis

See also
Alphonse (given name)
Alphonse (surname)
Saint-Alphonse (disambiguation)
Ildefonso (disambiguation)
San Ildefonso (disambiguation)